Jordan Lang (1813 - March 9, 1893) was a state legislator in South Carolina during the Reconstruction era. He had been a slave owned by the Lang family. He served in the South Carolina House of Representatives from 1868 until 1872 representing Darlington County, South Carolina. Lang Township and a school were named for him. Lang Township preceded the Palmetto School District.

He married Kizzie Keith and had 10 children.  He belonged to the Macedonoa Baptist Church in Darlington.

He served with fellow African American state legislators representing Darlington John Boston (politician) and Alfred Rush as well as white legislator G. Holliman. Rush was ambushed and assassinated in 1867.

Lawrence Chesterfield Bryant wrote about Lang and other African American politicians in South Carolina in his 1974 book South Carolina Negro Legislators: A Glorious Success.

See also
African-American officeholders during and following the Reconstruction era

References

1813 births
1893 deaths
American former slaves
People from Darlington County, South Carolina
Members of the South Carolina House of Representatives
African-American state legislators in South Carolina
African-American politicians during the Reconstruction Era
19th-century American politicians